Isvoarele is a commune located in Giurgiu County, Muntenia, Romania. It is composed of two villages, Isvoarele and Teiușu. These were part of Hotarele Commune until 2004, when they were split off to form a separate commune.

References

Communes in Giurgiu County
Localities in Muntenia